Joshua David Brown (1816–1876) was a Texas pioneer who became the first settler of Kerrville, the seat of Kerr County in the Texas Hill Country west of San Antonio. Brown donated the original  townsite for Kerrville, and the community was named after his friend and fellow Kentucky native, James Kerr (1790–1850). Brown made his living by making shingles harvested from cypress trees growing along the Guadalupe River.

Background

Brown was born in Madison County, Kentucky in 1816. His parents, Edward Brown and Anastasia Campbell Brown, migrated to Sabine County, Texas in the 1830s and Joshua followed them in 1837. After arriving in Texas, military service followed for Brown; after leaving the military he returned home and received a certificate for 640 acres of land. Brown was living in Gonzales when he became interested in shingle-making. It was during this time at Green DeWitt's Colony at Gonzales, that he became friends with James Kerr, a fellow soldier and later a land surveyor and official of the Colony. Brown then moved to a small settlement named Curry's Creek in Kendall County, where he learned the craft of shingle-making using cypress trees. In 1846, Brown and a group of ten men (all shingle-makers) went up the Guadalupe River to look for cypress trees, and selected a site to develop which would later become Kerrville. Brown and his men remained and worked at the camp for a few months until the Apache's drove them from the area. Brown and his men returned to the area in 1848 and remained this time, naming their settlement Brownsborough. Settlers followed them to the camp and established sawmills and farms along the river and streams.

Postal authorities had originally planned to name the new settlement "Brownsburg"; however, with so many surrounding communities having "Brown" as part of their name, Brown suggested the name Kerrsville, in honor of his friend, Major James Kerr, who never saw the area named for him. The letter "s" was eventually dropped from the original name, becoming Kerrville. In 1855, Brown petitioned the Texas legislature to form a new county, to be called Kerr County, from a large area of land out of Bexar County. The legislation was passed in 1856, and Brown then purchased more acreage, and it was from this tract of land that he donated four acres to build a courthouse, public school and separate jail for the new county. It was also at this time when Brown requested that Kerrville become the Kerr County seat.

Family
In 1846, Brown married Eleanor Smith and the couple had one daughter together, Mary Louisa; Smith died in 1848. A year later, he married Sarah Jane Goss (1834-1892), and they had seven children together. The couple purchased 2,000 acres southeast of Kerrville, where they built the home they lived in for the rest of their lives. A portion of that land is now the Kerrville Veteran's Administration Medical Center. Brown and his second wife are both buried in Brown-Goss cemetery, near the Veteran's Hospital on land donated by the Browns.

Military service
Brown served in the Cherokee Expedition in 1839 to expel the Cherokee's from East Texas, and participated in The Texas Revolution. Brown also served under Captain Zumwalt's command in the Wall's Campaign of 1842, and fought against the Mexican Army at Salado Creek in Bexar County at the Dawson Massacre. Brown was a veteran of the Summerville Campaign, also known as the Mier Expedition and he ended his military service with the Texas Volunteers Mounted Regiment and Benjamin McCulloch's spy command.

Kerrville now

In 1923, a portion of the Brown-Goss Cemetery was granted to the Woman's Auxiliary of a local American Legion post for a veterans' burial ground that would later become Kerrville National Cemetery. In 1986, a historical marker was dedicated to Brown that denotes he had the first business venture in Kerrville, a shingle and lumber mill that furnished building material for the first buildings of Kerrville. The marker was the first sanctioned dedication of the 1986 Sesquicentennial by the Kerr County Historical Commission. A Memorial Medallion was also placed on the Brown headstone by the members of the Daughters of the Republic of Texas. In 1998, a CSA Bronze Marker was dedicated by the Captain Charles Schreiner Chapter to further honor Brown and his contributions to the town.

The population of Kerrville in 2012 was 22,455. Kerrville is now known for its landscapes, scenic roadways, river and streams, lakes, caves, biological diversity, ranches, architecture, and popular culture. The city is also home to the Texas' Official State Arts and Crafts Fair, the Kerrville Folk Festival, the Museum of Western Art and Schreiner University. The Kerrville Independent School District services Kerville with four elementary schools, two middle schools and two high schools. In addition, there are also two Catholic schools and the Grace Academy of Kerrville which provide an alternative to the public school system.

References

External links
Photograph of Brown, his wife Sarah and their son Potter 
Brown's headstone, Brown-Goss Cemetery Kerrville, Texas

1816 births
1874 deaths
People from Kerrville, Texas
Kerr County, Texas
People from Kentucky
Texas pioneers